Asadabad also Asad-Abad is a village in the Jalilabad Rayon of Azerbaijan.

References 
 

Populated places in Jalilabad District (Azerbaijan)